Ana Sansão Timana is a Mozambican politician and trade unionist. In 1977 she was one of the first group of women elected to the People's Assembly.

Biography
Sansão was a FRELIMO candidate in the 1977 parliamentary elections, in which she was one of the first group of 27 women elected to the People's Assembly.  She was re-elected to the Assembly in 1986 from Maputo Province as a representative of Riopele. She later served as the executive secretary of the Maputo City and Province branch of the Mozambique Workers' Organization.

References

Date of birth unknown
FRELIMO politicians
Members of the Assembly of the Republic (Mozambique)
Mozambican trade unionists
Living people
20th-century Mozambican women politicians
20th-century Mozambican politicians
Year of birth missing (living people)